Tiruvallam Bhaskaran Nair (born G. Bhaskaran Nair) is a 20th-century Malayalam poet known for his Malayalam translation of the ancient Indian philosophical text of Tirukkural, among other Tamil, Sanskrit and English works. Nair translated only the first of the three books of the Kural text, and the translation was made in prose. The Sankaracharya of Kanchi has felicitated him as 'Kavyavallabhan'.

Translation of the Kural text
Bhaskaran Nair translated the first book (the book of Aram) of the Tirukkural into Malayalam and published it in 1962 at Trivandrum under the title Bhasha Tirukkural (Dharmakandam). It included the original Tamil verses and a Malayalam commentary on the couplets.

Quotations
According to Bhaskaran Nair, "Thirukkural begins where Bhagawat Gita exited," and "Tirukkural is not a matter for discussion or discourses as it remains to dismiss discussion and discourses."

In his letter to K. Kamaraj, the then chief minister of the Madras State, dated 30 August 1959, Nair further stated,

See also

 Tirukkural translations
 Tirukkural translations into Malayalam
 List of translators

References

Tamil–Malayalam translators
Translators of the Tirukkural into Malayalam
20th-century Indian poets
Poets from Kerala
Indian male poets
20th-century Indian male writers
Tirukkural translators